Frantzdy Pierrot (born 29 March 1995) is a Haitian-American professional footballer who plays as a forward for Israeli Premier League club Maccabi Haifa and the Haiti national team.

Club career

College and amateur
Pierrot played two years of college soccer at Northeastern University between 2014 and 2015, before transferring to Coastal Carolina University in 2016, where he played for another two years.

Pierrot also appeared for USL PDL side Reading United in 2016 and 2017.

Professional
On 19 January 2018, Pierrot was selected with the 27th overall pick of the 2018 MLS SuperDraft by Colorado Rapids. However, he did not sign with the club.

On 27 July 2018, Pierrot signed a four-year contract with Belgian First Division A side Mouscron. One year later, he joined French Ligue 2 club Guingamp. He signed a four-year contract.

On 3 July 2022, Pierrot signed a three-year contract with Maccabi Haifa of the Israeli Premier League.

Personal life
Pierrot was born in Haiti, but grew up in Massachusetts in the United States where he attended Melrose High School.

Career statistics

Club

International

Scores and results list Haiti's goal tally first, score column indicates score after each Pierrot goal.

References

External links

1995 births
Living people
People from Cap-Haïtien
Haitian footballers
Soccer players from Boston
Association football forwards
Reading United A.C. players
Royal Excel Mouscron players
En Avant Guingamp players
Maccabi Haifa F.C. players
Ligue 2 players
Belgian Pro League players
Israeli Premier League players
Haiti international footballers
USL League Two players
2019 CONCACAF Gold Cup players
2021 CONCACAF Gold Cup players
Haitian expatriate footballers
Expatriate footballers in Belgium
Expatriate footballers in France
Expatriate footballers in Israel
Haitian expatriate sportspeople in Belgium
Haitian expatriate sportspeople in France
Haitian expatriate sportspeople in Israel
Northeastern Huskies men's soccer players
Coastal Carolina Chanticleers men's soccer players
Colorado Rapids draft picks